The Man in the Moon is a shape resembling a human face or figure perceived in the Moon.

Man in the Moon or The Man in the Moon may also refer to:

Film 
 Man in the Moon (film), a 1960 film starring Kenneth More
 The Man in the Moon (1960 film), a 1960 television film
 The Man in the Moon, a 1991 film starring Reese Witherspoon
 The Man in the Moon, a 2011 short film directed by William Joyce
 The Man In The Moon, the mascot for the film company DreamWorks

Literature 
 The Man in the Moone, a 1638 novel by Francis Godwin
 The Man in the Moon (novel), a 2002 novel by James Blaylock
 Endymion, the Man in the Moon, an Elizabethan play by John Lyly
 The Man in the Moone, a poem by Michael Drayton
 "Mon in the Mone", a medieval English poem from the Harley Lyrics

Music 
 Man in the Moon (L.A. Guns album), or the title song (2001)
 Man in the Moon (Nektar album), or the title song (1980)
 Man in the Moon (Jonathan Edwards album)
 "Man in the Moon", a song by Daniel Amos from the 1981 album Horrendous Disc
 "Man in the Moon", a 2003 song by Fragma
 "The Man in the Moon", a 1941 song by Glenn Miller
 "Man in the Moon", a 1989 song by Titiyo
 "Man in the Moon", a song by Voice of the Beehive from the 1998 album Let It Bee
 "Man in the Moon", a song by Yes from the 1997 album Open Your Eyes

Other uses 
 Man in the Moon (event), a 2013 Fourth of July celebration produced by talk-radio personality Glenn Beck
 "The Man in the Moon", a 1950 episode of the radio program Dimension X
 The Man in the Moon, a pseudonym of Daniel Defoe
 The Man in the Moon, a 1920s American children's radio show on WABC in Newark, New Jersey

See also 
 Man and the Moon, an episode of the TV series Disneyland
 "Man in the Moonbounce", an episode of the TV series American Dad
 Man on the Moon (disambiguation)
 Woman in the Moon (disambiguation)
 Moon Man (disambiguation)